Oksana Bulgakowa (born 18 February 1954) is a professor of film history and film analysis at the University of Mainz.

Career 
Born in Nikopol, Soviet Union, Bulgakowa completed in 1977 a five-year study of film theory and history at Allunionsinstitut of Cinematography (VGIK) in Moscow, and then followed her husband Dietmar Hochmuth in the DDR where a Szenaristenlehrgang at the graduated Academy of Film and Television in Potsdam-Babelsberg.

1982 doctorate at the Humboldt University of Berlin to Dr. phil. the technical theory of Performing Arts. As a Researcher, she worked for institutions such as the Institute of Performing Arts, the Research Group on film the Academy of Arts of the GDR (1984–1990). After the wall came down, she was at the Friends of the German Cinematheque and the International Forum of New Cinema (1990–1993), the development agency scientific new projects (1994– 1996) and at the Ruhr-Universität Bochum on Lotman – Institute for Russian and Soviet Culture (2002–2005) worked.

Bulgakowa taught at the Humboldt University, the Drama School Leipzig and Freie Universität Berlin. As a visiting professor she taught at the universities Stanford University (1998–2004) and University of California Berkeley (2004), before being appointed in 2004 as professor at the International Film School Cologne.

Work 
At the center of scientific and editorial Bulgakowa's work are life and work of Sergei Eisenstein. She has written and edited books on the director and theoretician. They also explored specific aspects of Russian-Soviet film history.

She was also curator of several exhibitions (including "Moscow – Berlin, Berlin – Moscow, 1990-1950", Martin-Gropius-Bau, Berlin 1995; "Sergei Eisenstein: The Mexican Drawings", Antwerp 2009).

In addition, she worked as a writer and director, the film essays The Different Faces of Sergei Eisenstein (in collaboration with Dietmar Hochmuth) and Stalin - A Mosfilmproduktion (in collaboration with Frieda Grafe and Enno Patalas) and The Factory of Gestures. Body Language in Film (2008).

Filmography 
 1988: In one breath (writer with Dietmar Hochmuth)

Literature 
 Oksana Bulgakowa:  The unusual adventure of Dr. Mabuse in the land of Bolshevik. The book accompanying the film series "Moscow – Berlin".  Preface Ulrich Gregor. Arsenal (Film Institute), Berlin 1995

References

External links 
 
 
 profile at the University of Mainz
 profile at the ifs – international film school cologne
 profile at the Center for Literary and Cultural Research ZfL, Berlin
 profile at Stanford University, California
 Bulgakowa: The Visual Universe of Sergei Eisenstein. Daniel Langlois Foundation, Montreal

German film historians
Academic staff of Johannes Gutenberg University Mainz
Academic staff of the Free University of Berlin
Academic staff of the Humboldt University of Berlin
Stanford University faculty
University of California, Berkeley faculty
Soviet emigrants to Germany
People from Nikopol, Ukraine
20th-century German historians
21st-century German historians
20th-century German women writers
21st-century German women writers
1954 births
Living people
Gerasimov Institute of Cinematography alumni
German women historians